Ben S'Rour District is a district of M'Sila Province, Algeria.

Municipalities
The district is further divided into 4 municipalities:

Ben Srour
Ouled Slimane
Zarzour
Mohamed Boudiaf

District of M'Sila Province